Mahmudabad Rural District is in the Central District of Shahin Dezh County, West Azerbaijan province, Iran. At the National Census of 2006, its population was 7,899 in 1,741 households. There were 8,220 inhabitants in 2,159 households at the following census of 2011. At the most recent census of 2016, the population of the rural district was 7,755 in 2,319 households. The largest of its 38 villages was Aq Tappeh, with 1,267 people.

References 

Shahin Dezh County

Rural Districts of West Azerbaijan Province

Populated places in West Azerbaijan Province

Populated places in Shahin Dezh County